Common fleabane is a common name for several flowering plants and may refer to:

Erigeron philadelphicus, native to North America
Pulicaria dysenterica, native to Europe and western Asia